Fabrica means a device in Latin, and derivative words mean "factory" in French (fabrique), Italian (fabbrica), Portuguese (fábrica), Romanian (fabrica) and Spanish (fábrica) among other Romance languages. It may also refer to:

 Fabrica, Sagay, a neighborhood of the city of Sagay, Negros Occidental in the Philippines
 Fabrica research centre, a communications research centre in Italy, part of the Benetton Group
 La Fábrica (Real Madrid), the player development center of Real Madrid CF in Spain
 La Fábrica (Sant Just Desvern), a converted former cement plant that is now headquarters of Ricardo Bofill Taller de Arquitectiura near Barcelona
 Fabrica, a village in Gârbou , Sălaj County, Romania
 Fabrica Records, an independent music label